Florence Lim (21 January 1905 – 16 February 1979), better known as Lim Cho-cho, was a Chinese Canadian actress in the cinema of the Republic of China and British Hong Kong from 1925 to 1954. She was the second wife of filmmaker Lai Man-Wai and the mother of actors Lai Hang and Lai Suen. Gigi Lai is her granddaughter.

Early life
Florence Lim was born in Victoria, British Columbia, Canada, where her grandfather, an immigrant from Xinhui (now part of Jiangmen), Guangdong, China, owned a rice shop. Her father died when she was 3. She attended Chinese Public School in Victoria which allowed her to be proficient in both English and Chinese.  When she was 9, her widowed mother went to Hong Kong to receive medical treatment, and at age 12 Lim joined her in Hong Kong, having completed primary school. In Hong Kong she enrolled in Ying Wa Girls' School. One of her classmates named Lai Hang-kau (who would later become known as Lai Cheuk-cheuk) introduced her to her uncle Lai Man-Wai. Even though he was 12 years her senior and already married, Lim married him as his second wife in 1920, when she was 15.

Career
Lim Cho-cho's acting career started in Hong Kong when she played the lead role in Rouge (1925), the first film produced by her husband's China Sun Motion Picture Company. In 1926, China Sun relocated to Shanghai, and there Lim continued to star in silent films such as A Poet from the Sea (1927) and Romance of the Western Chamber (1927). Her credits after China Sun became the Lianhua Film Company in 1930 included A Spray of Plum Blossoms (1931), Song of China (1935), National Customs (1935), and Song of a Kind Mother (1937). Lim particularly excelled in mother roles. Her son Lai Hang also appeared in many films around this time. In 1931, she also acted in the Indian film Kamar-Al-Zaman, an adaptation of a tale from the Arabian Nights directed by Shah G. Agha, where she appeared in the role of princess Budur.

During the Second Sino-Japanese War (1937–1945), the Lais first returned to Hong Kong when Japan invaded Shanghai in 1937. In Hong Kong Lim continued to act in films, many patriotic and anti-Japanese in nature. Following Japan's invasion of Hong Kong in 1941, the family escaped to mainland China, first to Chikan, Kaiping, Guangdong, where at one point Lim had to peddle old clothes on the street to make ends meet. When Japanese soldiers overran Kaiping in 1943, they fled again, this time to Guilin, Guangxi, where they ran a photographic studio. After the war ended, the family returned to Hong Kong, and Lim acted again for another 8 years. She retired after her husband's 1953 death to raise their 9 children. She visited mainland China in the 1970s before her death in Hong Kong in 1979.

Filmography

In popular culture
In the 1991 film Center Stage, Lim Cho-cho is portrayed by Cecilia Yip, who spoke Cantonese, Mandarin and English in her role.

References

External links

1905 births
1979 deaths
20th-century Chinese actresses
20th-century Hong Kong actresses
20th-century Canadian actresses
Chinese film actresses
Chinese silent film actresses
Canadian film actresses
Hong Kong film actresses
Canadian actresses of Chinese descent
Actresses from Victoria, British Columbia
Canadian emigrants to Hong Kong
Canadian silent film actresses